Dane Loyd Pereira (born 1985) is an Indian football player. He played for Mumbai F.C. in the I-League and Chennaiyin FC in the ISL. In April 2015, Pereira was banned for a year after he tested positive for the anabolic steroid Nandrolone.

Pereira, a defensive midfielder, has been one of the mainstays of Mumbai F.C. since 2007. He can also play as side back. Pereira started as a youth player but moved up to the senior team.

Personal life
Pereira's brother Keegan Pereira is also a footballer and plays for Bengaluru FC, Mumbai City FC and India national football team.

References

External links
 goal.com
 

Indian footballers
1985 births
Footballers from Mumbai
Living people
Mumbai FC players
I-League players
Association football goalkeepers